Sandro Kopp (born 1978) is a German–New Zealand visual artist based in Scotland. His work deals with the concept of "mediated presence"  and explores the intersection of classical painting and digital technology.

Biography
Kopp grew up in Germany and obtained his Abitur with main subjects in fine art and English in 1998. He then emigrated to New Zealand, his mother's home country, in 2000 where he lived and studied in Wellington.

Since 2006, Kopp has been based in Nairn in the Highland region of Scotland, working primarily on oil portraits of family and friends painted from Skype conversations.

Personal life
Kopp has been in a relationship with actress Tilda Swinton since 2004. Kopp does not have children.

Exhibitions
Kopp's work has been exhibited internationally. A list of some recent exhibitions include:

December 2015, FEEDBACKLOOP, FIVE ELEVEN, New York
December 2014, Sono Qui, Otto Zoo, Milan
May 2014, Analogue, Galerie Antoine Laurentin, Paris
June 2013, Cinematic Visions, Victoria Miro Gallery, London
October 2013, Fiercely Loved, Timothy Everest, London
October 2012, Mediated Presence, 6 Fitzroy Square, London
January 2012, There You Are., Lehmann Maupin, New York
November 2011, Krauts Projects: INSIGHTS II, Kunst/Halle, Heidelberg, Germany
May 2011, Being with You, IST festival, Istanbul, Turkey
December 2010, Krauts Projects: INSIGHTS, Kunst/Halle, Heidelberg, Germany
November 2010, Artist Residency, TSKW, Florida
October 2010, Not a Still Frame, Brachfeld Gallery, Paris
March 2009, Krauts Projects: Go Figure, Frankfurt, Germany
May 2008, PRESENT., HP Garcia Gallery, New York
April 2008, Krauts Projects: Creative Clash, Mannheim Castle, Germany
March 2008, Scottish National Portrait Gallery, Edinburgh, BP Awards
November 2007, Junge Kunst 69, Heidelberger Kunstverein, Germany
June 2007, National Portrait Gallery, London, BP Awards

References

External links
 
 

1978 births
Living people
21st-century German painters
21st-century German male artists
German contemporary artists
New Zealand contemporary artists